Sevens football is a variation form of association football played in India with seven players on each side, typically in a smaller field than a full-size football pitch. Sevens football is predominantly popular in northern Kerala in southern India. The matches in Sevens tournaments are often played to fully packed stadiums. The refereeing in the games is not as strict as in regular football and games can be physical and injury-prone. Sevens tournaments have also attracted players from other parts of India, as well as international players including some from Africa. Matches are held from November to May (suspended during the monsoon break).

The All Kerala Sevens' Football Association (SFA) organizes around 50 Sevens tournaments among different clubs across Kerala.

Several footballers from Kerala, including India internationals such as I. M. Vijayan, Ashique Kuruniyan, and Anas Edathodika, credit their experiences in Sevens tournaments for helping them improve their footballing skills and develop their passion for the sport.

In popular culture
 Sudani from Nigeria (2018)
 Sevenes (2011)

References

Football in Kerala
Sport in Kerala
Association football terminology
Association football variants
Athletic sports
Ball games
Team sports